Laurie Zimmer (also credited as Laura Fanning) is an American former actress best known for her role as Leigh, the courageous secretary of the besieged police station, in John Carpenter's 1976 action film Assault on Precinct 13.

Acting career
Zimmer had a brief acting career during the mid-to-late 1970s. After playing the female lead opposite Darwin Joston and Austin Stoker in Assault on Precinct 13, Zimmer appeared on stage in a Los Angeles production of the John Ford Noonan play, Getting Through The Night, where her performance was reviewed as "a model of prissiness and timorous self-importance". She then appeared (as Laura Fanning) in the 1977 comedy spoof American Raspberry, and two 1977 French films: Jean Eustache's Une sale histoire ("A Dirty Story") and Charlotte Szlovak's Slow City, Moving Fast (also known by the French title D'un Jour a L'Autre). Shortly thereafter, Zimmer's career stalled, and, after playing her fifth role (in 1979's television movie Survival of Dana), she permanently retired from acting.

Do You Remember Laurie Zimmer?
Charlotte Szlovak, who had directed Zimmer in Slow City, Moving Fast, released her documentary film Do You Remember Laurie Zimmer? in 2003. The film chronicles Szlovak's search to discover why Zimmer quit acting, where she is now, and what she is doing.

The film reveals that Zimmer now lives near San Francisco, California, works as a teacher, is married to actor Bruce Steele, and has two sons: musician Julian Steele of the band The K.O. Bros, and performance artist Max Steele.

Filmography

References

External links

20th-century American actresses
Actresses from California
American film actresses
Living people
People from the San Francisco Bay Area
Year of birth missing (living people)
Place of birth missing (living people)
21st-century American women